Belgium women's national under-17 football team represents Belgium in international youth football competitions.

Competitive record

FIFA U-17 Women's World Cup

The team has never qualified for the  FIFA U-17 Women's World Cup.

UEFA Women's Under-17 Championship 

The team has only qualified for the 2013 UEFA Women's Under-17 Championship and ended 4th.

See also
Belgium women's national football team

References

External links

Youth football in Belgium
Women's national under-17 association football teams
National youth sports teams of Belgium